West Grey is a township in the northern area of Southwestern Ontario, Canada, in Grey County spanning across the River Styx, the Rocky Saugeen River, the Beatty Saugeen River, and the South Saugeen River.

The municipality was formed by order of the Province of Ontario on January 1, 2001 when the former Townships of Bentinck, Glenelg, and Normanby, the Village of Neustadt, and the Town of Durham were amalgamated in a county-wide reorganization.

Communities
The Municipality of West Grey comprises the communities of Aberdeen, Allan Park, Alsfeldt, Ayton, Barrhead, Bentinck, Biemans Corners, Bunessan, Calderwood, Crawford, Durham, Edge Hill, Elmwood, Glen, Glenelg Centre, Habermehl, Hampden, Irish Lake, Lamlash, Lauderbach, Lauriston, Louise, Moltke, Mulock, Nenagh, Neustadt, Pomona, Priceville, Rocky Saugeen, Topcliff, Traverston, Vickers, Waudby and Welbeck.

Demographics 

Populations prior to amalgamation (2001):
 Population total in 1996: 11,499
 Bentinck (township): 3,597
 Durham (town): 2,641
 Glenelg (township): 2,136
 Neustadt (village): 568
 Normanby (township): 2,678
 Populations in 1991: 
 Bentinck (township): 3,463
 Durham (town): 2,558
 Glenelg (township): 1,871
 Neustadt (village): 551
 Normanby (township): 2,797

Education 
West Grey has three elementary schools: Normanby Community School, Spruce Ridge Community School, and St. Peter's and St. Paul's Catholic School. Public school education is managed by the Bluewater and District School Board and Catholic schools are managed by the Bruce-Grey Catholic School Board.

Healthcare 
West Grey has one hospital in the Town of Durham: South Bruce Grey Health Centre, Durham.  The 10-bed hospital has an Emergency Department available 24-7, laboratory, pharmacy, and diagnostic services. The West Grey Medical Clinic provides services by family doctors and allied health professionals. The Clinic is owned and managed by the Durham Hospital Foundation.

Services

Fire 
West Grey Fire Department has three stations: Durham, Ayton, and Neustadt.

Library 
West Grey Public Library has three branches: Durham, Ayton, and Neustadt.

Police  
Unlike most rural communities, West Grey maintains its own police force, the West Grey Police Service with headquarters in the Town of Durham.

Recreation 
West Grey has a variety of halls and recreation centres across the municipality including: Ayton Centennial Hall, Durham Community Centre, Durham Town Hall, Elmwood Community Centre, Glenel Hall, Lamlash Hall, Neustadt Arena, Neustadt Community Centre and Normanby Arena Complex.  Enjoy swimming at the Durham Wading Pool and the Middle Dam on the Saugeen River.

Transit 
Grey County Transit provides transportation along County Road 4 through the Town of Durham from Flesherton to Walkerton.

GOST (Guelph Owen Sound Transportation) is a public transportation service connecting people from Owen Sound to Guelph along Hwy 10 with a stop in Durham.

Saugeen Mobility and Regional Transit (SMART) provides accessible transportation for people who cannot travel by conventional transit or taxi.

See also
List of townships in Ontario

References

External links

Lower-tier municipalities in Ontario
Municipalities in Grey County